The Orange County Line is a commuter rail line run by Metrolink from Los Angeles through Orange County to Oceanside in San Diego County, connecting with the Coaster commuter rail service to San Diego. The Orange County Line carries passengers to the primary Metrolink hub at Union Station in downtown Los Angeles, as well as to many attractions in Orange County including the Knott's Berry Farm area,  Angel Stadium of Anaheim and the Honda Center, the Disneyland Resort, Old Town Orange, Santa Ana Zoo, Mission San Juan Capistrano and many more. In San Diego County, it serves the Oceanside Pier and Camp Pendelton.

History 
The Orange County Line began on April 30, 1990 as the Orange County Commuter, an Amtrak-operated service between Los Angeles and San Juan Capistrano funded by the Orange County Transportation Authority. The Orange County Commuter made a single weekday round-trip, departing San Juan Capistrano in the morning and returning in the evening. Between July and December 1993 during the Orange County Commuter's final months, both the Commerce and Orange Transportation Center stations opened. Amtrak conveyed the route to Metrolink on March 28, 1994, becoming the "Orange County Line" and Metrolink's fifth route. Service expanded to eight trips in 1995.

In October 2005, the Orange County Transportation Authority announced that it would increase service on the Orange County Line, running trains twenty hours daily, seven days a week every 30 minutes. The first part of the additional service was implemented in June 2006 with Saturday service, and July 2006 with Sunday service. The plan has drawn criticism as many Metrolink stations are located beyond walking distance from important destinations such as Disneyland and the adjacent Anaheim Convention Center, Knott's Berry Farm, and the Irvine Spectrum. Funds for new rolling stock and track improvements were allocated from the voter-approved Measure M half-cent sales tax, while critics had advocated using the money for bus operations or other transit service instead. To address some of these issues, OCTA operates a series of Stationlink shuttle routes that connect Metrolink stations in Orange County to nearby destinations.

 service is provided seven days a week, with 29 trains on weekdays, and 8 on weekends. The Amtrak Pacific Surfliner supplements Orange County Line service by providing limited stop service along the corridor and more service during mid-days, nights and weekends.

Future 
The route of the Orange County Line may be used for future extensions of the planned California High-Speed Rail line from Los Angeles Union Station to Anaheim. Potential stops include Norwalk or Fullerton.

Route 
While the Orange County Line shares trackage with Amtrak's Pacific Surfliner trains, its northernmost stations (from Los Angeles to Fullerton, excluding Commerce) are shared with the 91 Line and nearly all of its other stations with the Inland Empire–Orange County Line (from Orange to Oceanside).

The Orange County Line runs on the BNSF Railway's Southern Transcon track between Los Angeles and Fullerton, under a shared-right-of-way agreement.  Several stations, most notably the ones in downtown Fullerton and Santa Ana, are renovated Spanish Colonial Revival depots originally built by the Atchison, Topeka and Santa Fe Railway. Sections of the line between Santa Ana and Oceanside allow for  operating speeds.

Stations

The October 2017 timetable shows ten weekday trains from Los Angeles to Oceanside and back, eight from Fullerton to Laguna Niguel and back, seven from Los Angeles to Laguna Niguel and back, four from Fullerton to Oceanside, and two from Los Angeles to Irvine and back.

Passengers that have monthly passes can use Pacific Surfliner trains between their station pairs on any day except for specific blacked out days by Amtrak for holidays and special events (such as events at Del Mar) on this line.

See also 
 Transportation in San Diego County

References

External links

Orange County Line schedule

Orange County Line
Public transportation in Orange County, California
Public transportation in Los Angeles County, California
Public transportation in San Diego County, California
Public transportation in Southern California
Orange County Transportation Authority
Railway lines opened in 1990
1990 establishments in California